Kathleen Fontaine (born 22 March 1962) is an adjunct professor of international policy at Rensselaer Polytechnic Institute. Her research areas include ethics, data policy, and applied public policy.

Career 
Born in Baltimore, Maryland, USA, Fontaine received a BS in physics and astrophysics from the New Mexico Institute of Mining and Technology in 1984. In 2002 she completed her Master of Arts in Science, Technology, and Public Policy from The George Washington University. In 2013 she completed her PhD in Public Policy and Public Administration from Walden University.  Fontaine's dissertation topic for her PhD was entitled, "Group on Earth Observations:  A Case Study of an International Organization."

Fontaine's career has included work at the National Aeronautics and Space Administration (NASA) Global Change Data Center from 2003 to 2005 where she managed the Earth Science Data Systems Working Groups. Starting in 2005, Fontaine worked as a policy analyst for NASA until 2014. From 2014 to 2015 she was the Managing Director of RDA/US at Rensselaer Polytechnic Institute, where she became an adjunct professor in 2016.

Fontaine has been involved in policy work with several international scientific organizations. She participated in the Committee on Earth Observations Satellites (CEOS) Working Group on Information Systems and Services (WGISS); in the Group on Earth Observations (GEO). She is also a member of the Research Data Alliance and the Deep Carbon Observatory, where she is on the Data Science Team.

References 

Date of birth missing (living people)
Living people
21st-century American physicists
American astrophysicists
Rensselaer Polytechnic Institute faculty
1962 births